

Giulio Leonelli (died 1614) was a civil lawyer who, along with several other men, founded a library in Rome which housed more than forty-thousand works. He was appointed as Governor of Turin by the Duke of Savoy and later was "appointed by the Court of Rome to the main offices of the Marca, then of Umbria, and finally Avignon."

He married Virginia Fornari and they had six children: three daughters, one a nun; and three sons – Mutatesia Leonelli; Innocenzo Leonelli; Carlo Leonelli, later known as Ignatius of Jesus.

References

Citations

Bibliography

 

 

Governors of Turin
1614 deaths
Year of birth missing
17th-century Italian lawyers